Ionescu (Francisized as Ionesco or Jonesco) is a Romanian surname, derived from the male given name Ion. It may refer to:

Ionescu
Alexandru Ionescu, bobsledder
Alexandru Ionescu, socialist militant
Cassius Ionescu-Tulcea, mathematician
Claudiu Eugen Ionescu, handball player
Constantin Al. Ionescu-Caion, journalist
Constantin Ionescu, chess grandmaster
Corneliu Ionescu, painter
Cristian Ionescu, politician
Elisabeta Ionescu, Romanian handball player
Emanoil Ionescu, soldier
Eugen Ionescu, also Eugène Ionesco, absurdist playwright
Gheorghe Ionescu, painter
Gheorghe Ionescu-Sisești, agronomist
Ilarion Ionescu-Galați, violinist and conductor
Ion Ionescu de la Brad, agronomist and economist
Marian Ionescu, pioneer cardiac surgeon
Mircea Ionescu Quintus, politician
Nae Ionescu, philosopher
Nicolae Ionescu, politician
Raicu Ionescu-Rion, socialist journalist, sociologist and art critic
Sabrina Ionescu, American basketball player
Șerban Ionescu, actor
Silviu Ionescu, Romanian diplomat
Ștefan Ionescu, ice hockey player
Take Ionescu, politician
Theodor V. Ionescu, physicist
Valentin Ionescu, politician
Valeriu Ionescu, writer, published under the name I. Valerian
Vali Ionescu, long jumper

Ionesco
Carmen Ionesco, Canadian discus thrower of Romanian descent
Eugène Ionesco, playwright
Eva Ionesco, actress
Irina Ionesco, photographer

Others
Sanda Movilă (born Maria Ionescu), novelist
N. Porsenna (born Nicu Porsena Ionescu), writer and politician
Urmuz (born Dimitrie Dim. Ionescu-Buzeu), writer

Romanian-language surnames
Patronymic surnames
Surnames from given names